60S ribosomal protein L15 is a protein that in humans is encoded by the RPL15 gene.

Ribosomes, the organelles that catalyze protein synthesis, consist of a small 40S subunit and a large 60S subunit. Together these subunits are composed of 4 RNA species and approximately 80 structurally distinct proteins. This gene encodes a ribosomal protein that is a component of the 60S subunit. The protein belongs to the L15E family of ribosomal proteins. It is located in the cytoplasm. This gene shares sequence similarity with the yeast ribosomal protein YL10 gene. Although this gene has been referred to as RPL10, its official symbol is RPL15. This gene has been shown to be overexpressed in some esophageal tumors compared to normal matched tissues. Transcript variants utilizing alternative polyA signals exist. As is typical for genes encoding ribosomal proteins, there are multiple processed pseudogenes of this gene dispersed through the genome.

References

Further reading

Ribosomal proteins